Nodak Electric Cooperative is a public utility cooperative based in Grand Forks, North Dakota, and provides electricity to rural customers and small towns across a portion of northeast North Dakota, and is a member of Minnkota Power Cooperative.

When electric cooperatives began organizing in the late 1930s after the formation of the Rural Electrification Administration and North Dakota's ratification of the Electric Cooperative Corporation Act in 1937, several projects got underway across northeastern North Dakota in 1939. They were Forks (Grand Forks County), Walsh (Walsh County), Red River (Traill County), and Five-Star (Nelson County). These were consolidated into a single project in 1940, as all four projects struggled to secure a reliable source of power, which also led to the formation of Minnkota Power Cooperative later that same year.

A neighboring cooperative, Sheyenne Valley Electric Cooperative, merged into Nodak Electric in 2001.

External links
Nodak Electric Cooperative website

Electric cooperatives in North Dakota
Electric power companies of the United States
Greater Grand Forks